The Purus National Forest is a national forest in the state of Amazonas, Brazil.
It surrounds the shamanic-Christian community of Céu do Mapiá.

Location

The Purus National Forest is in the municipality of Pauini, Amazonas.
It is on the left (west) bank of the Purus River, downstream from Boca do Acre.
The Inauini/Teuini Indigenous Territory to the north partly overlaps the national forest.
It is bounded to the west by the Mapiá-Inauini National Forest.
To the south it adjoins the Camicuã Indigeous Territory.

It takes at least six hours to cover the  road from Rio Branco to Boca do Acre, and the same length of time by boat on the Purus River and then the Mapia stream to reach the central village of Céu do Mapiá.
This community in the forest is devoted to consecration of the shamanic-Christian syncretism of Santo Daime.
During the dry season access is limited to the Purus River.

Environment

Rainfall is from  annually.
Rain mostly falls in the months of October to April, while the driest season is from June to August.
The topography is a plateau with hills and flat areas dissected by deep valleys.
The alluvial areas that are flooded by the Purus River are relatively fertile due to sediments from the Andes.
However, most of the soils are very poor and acidic.

The vegetation is entirely dense rainforest.
In the higher terra firma areas and the valley slopes the canopy reaches .
The main tree species are Dinizia excelsa, Manilkara huberi, Anacardium species, Parkia pendula and Bertholletia excelsa.
The Mapiá is densely occupied, with many areas of deforestation along its course.
In general the area beyond the village of Céu do Mapiá and the Teuini stream is well-preserved.

History

It is administered by the Chico Mendes Institute for Biodiversity Conservation (ICMBio).
The forest is classed as IUCN protected area category VI (protected area with sustainable use of natural resources).
The purpose is sustainable multiple use of forest resources, and scientific research with emphasis on methods for sustainable exploitation of native forests.

On 26 September 2005 the Instituto Nacional de Colonização e Reforma Agrária (INCRA – National Institute for Colonization and Agrarian Reform) recognised the forest as supporting 200 families of small producers, who would qualify for PRONAF support. 
This was amended to 300 families on 31 December 2008.
The management plan was approved on 18 March 2009.
The consultative council was created on 10 March 2010.

Economy

In July 2007 the Residents Association of Céu do Mapiá Village (Associação de Moradores da Vila Céu do Mapiá - AMVCM) began to implement community forest management in the village's zone of community use in partnership with the Brazilian Institute of Environment and Renewable Natural Resources, the Federal University of Viçosa and the Rio de Janeiro Botanical Garden.
The plan is to produce sufficient quantities of wood to meet community demand.

As of 2010 the community was engaged in subsistence farming and raising small animals.
There were 600 residents.
On 19 October 2011 a working group was constituted to discuss and evaluate forms of occupation, population growth and migration in the village of Céu do Mapiá.

Notes

Sources

Further reading

National forests of Brazil
Protected areas of Amazonas (Brazilian state)
1988 establishments in Brazil